The Herman Voaden Playwriting Competition is a biennial literary award, presented by Queen's University to plays by Canadian playwrights. The award was created in 1997, funded by a bequest to the university by the late playwright Herman Voaden. 

The competition awards a first prize of $3,000 and a second prize of $2,000. In addition to the cash prizes, both the first and second prize winners receive workshop productions of their play at the Thousand Islands Playhouse. Honourable mentions are also given.

Prize winners have included Brian Drader's The Norbals, Richard Sanger's Two Words for Snow, Hiro Kanagawa's Slants, Michael MacLennan's Last Romantics and The Shooting Stage, Kent Stetson's New Arcadia, Jason Hall's Eyes Catch Fire, Charlotte Corbeil-Coleman's Scratch, Kevin Loring's Where the Blood Mixes, Donna-Michelle St. Bernard's Gas Girls, Jordan Tannahill's Late Company, David James Brock's Wet, Norman Yeung's Theory, and Michael Kras' The Team.

References

External links

Canadian dramatist and playwright awards
1997 establishments in Ontario
Awards established in 1997
Queen's University at Kingston